Michael Hartley (born 28 November 1946) is a Canadian bobsledder. He competed in the two-man event at the 1972 Winter Olympics.

References

1946 births
Living people
Canadian male bobsledders
Olympic bobsledders of Canada
Bobsledders at the 1972 Winter Olympics
Sportspeople from Calgary